Gunther Hartmann (born 7 December 1966 in Leutkirch) is a German immunologist and clinical pharmacologist. Since 2007 he has been the Director of the Institute of Clinical Chemistry and Clinical Pharmacology at the University Hospital of the University of Bonn.

Career 
In 1986, Hartmann graduated from Salvator College Catholic High School in Bad Wurzach and then began his medical studies at the Medical School of the University of Ulm. He earned his medical degree there in 1994 from the Department of Clinical Genetics and then became a clinical fellow at the Medizinische Klinik Innenstadt of the Ludwig Maximilian University of Munich. In 1998, he joined the lab of Arthur Krieg  at the University of Iowa as a postdoctoral researcher. Then in 2001, he completed his habilitation degree in Clinical Pharmacology at LMU Munich.

Hartmann's group has long been interested in understanding how the innate immune system recognizes foreign nucleic acids, to protect against threats from viruses and pathogens. This work began when he was a postdoc in Munich. In the Krieg lab in Iowa, he characterized the CpG motif in DNA that is detected by human Toll-like receptor 9 (TLR9) and then back in Munich he studied the immunobiological consequences of TLR9 activation. First in Munich and then in Bonn, his group went on to study RNA recognition by TLR7, specifically the TLR7-mediated detection of short interfering RNAs (siRNA). Along these lines, the Hartmann group has studied RIG-I as a sensor for cytosolic RNA, and identified blunt-ended double-stranded RNA with a 5´-triphosphate as the RIG-I ligand. In addition, the group has also studied the recognition of cytosolic double-stranded DNA by the cGAS/STING pathway.

In 2005, Hartmann was made head of the Department of Clinical Pharmacology at the University Hospital Bonn (UKB), and in 2007, he was appointed Professor and Director of the Institute of Clinical Chemistry and Clinical Pharmacology including the Central Laboratory at the UKB. Since 2009, he has been a member of the expert committee on Cancer Therapy Trials at the German Cancer Aid organization.
He is the founding and current spokesperson for the ImmunoSensation Cluster of Excellence, funded by the Deutsche Forschungsgemeinschaft (DFG) starting in November 2012 and renewed in 2019. He has served as president of the international Oligonucleotide Therapeutic Society (2011–12). In 2012, Hartmann was awarded the Gottfried Wilhelm Leibniz Prize by the DFG in recognition of his work on the detection of nucleic acids by the immune system. In 2016, he was appointed Vice Dean of Research for the Medical Faculty of the University of Bonn. Beginning in 2018, he is serving as the spokesperson for the Collaborative Research Center/Transregio grant “Nucleic Acid Immunity”, funded by the DFG. In addition, Hartmann was one of the founders of a spin-off company (Rigontec GmbH) developing 5'-triphosphate RNAs to target RIG-I, which was acquired by Merck & Co. in 2017.

Honors 
 2000: "Young Master" of the German Society of Hematology and Oncology
 2000: Paul Martini Prize 
 2004: Georg Heberer Award of the Chiles Foundation in Portland
 2004: Ludwig Heilmeyer Award
 2004: Biofuture Award of the Federal Ministry of Education and Research
 2007: Wilhelm Vaillant Prize for Medical Research
 2009: GoBio Prize of the Federal Ministry of Education and Research
 2011: Dr. Friedrich Sasse Medal in gold of the Berlin Medical Society
 2012: Gottfried Wilhelm Leibniz Prize
 2013: Member of the German Academy of Sciences Leopoldina

References

External links 
 Gunther Hartmann's CV (PDF)
 List of publications (PDF; 142 kB)
 Homepage of the Institute for Clinical Chemistry and Clinical Pharmacology at the University of Bonn 

1966 births
Living people
People from Leutkirch im Allgäu
German pharmacologists
Clinical pharmacologists
Academic staff of the University of Bonn
Gottfried Wilhelm Leibniz Prize winners
20th-century German physicians
21st-century German physicians